The 2017 Ferrari Challenge Europe is the 24th season of Ferrari Challenge Europe. The season consisted of 7 rounds, starting at the Circuit Ricardo Tormo on May 20 and ending at the Mugello Circuit on October 28.

Fabienne Wohlwend became the first woman to win any Ferrari Challenge race in class or outright with her victory in the second Coppa Shell race at Imola.

Calendar

Entry list 
All teams and drivers used the Ferrari 488 Challenge fitted with Pirelli tyres.

Trofeo Pirelli

Coppa Shell

Results and standings

Race results

Championship standings 
Points were awarded to the top ten classified finishers as follows:

Trofeo Pirelli

Coppa Shell

See also 
 2017 Finali Mondiali

References

External links 
 Official website

Europe 2017
Ferrari Challenge Europe